Minuscule 1152 (in the Gregory-Aland numbering), also known as the Nicolaus Gospels, or Goodspeed Ms. Grk. 11. It is a Greek minuscule manuscript of the four Gospels, dated paleographically May 4, 1133.

Description 

The codex contains the complete text of the four Gospels, and contains 15th century Lectionary tables of Synaxarion and Menologion. 

It is currently housed at the University of Chicago Library(Ms. 129).

History 

It was written in Édhessa, Greece (Macedonia), on May 4, 1133.

See also 

 List of New Testament minuscules (1001–2000)
 Purple parchment
 Textual criticism

References

Further reading 

 Caspar René Gregory, Textkritik des Neuen Testamentes (Leipzig: J.C. Hinrichs, 1900-1909), vol. 1, p. 243; vol. 3, pp. 1131, 1474. no. 1152.

External links 
 Minuscule 1152

Purple parchment
Greek New Testament minuscules
9th-century biblical manuscripts
Memory of the World Register
University of Chicago Library